Bloodymania is a professional wrestling event, produced annually in August by Juggalo Championship Wrestling (JCW). All events are held on a Sunday at midnight during the four-day musical event Gathering of the Juggalos. The company regards it as the flagship event of JCW, as it is the biggest event that they hold in the year. The event was first produced in 2007, and, as of 2013, six more editions have since been held consecutively.

JCW's internet wrestling show SlamTV! is tailored to reach its climax at Bloodymania, which features matches for the company's championship titles, as well as specialty and gimmick matches. Since its inception in 2007, all events have been held at Hogrock Campgrounds Cave-In-Rock, Illinois.

Bloodymania events, like other professional wrestling shows, feature matches that are prearranged by the promotion's writing staff. These matches are non-competitive performances that combine elements of catch wrestling, mock combat, and theatre. Leading up to the pay-per-view, wrestlers are portrayed as either villains or heroes in the scripted events that build tension and culminate in a wrestling match at the event.

History
Bloodymania was the first major event held by Juggalo Championship Wrestling after its name change, from Juggalo Championshit Wrestling, on July 16, 2007. Each event consists of a main event and an undercard that feature championship matches and other various matches. The first event was held on August 12, 2007. The 2007 edition was the first, and currently only, event to be released on DVD. Bloodymania III received promotion by Pro Wrestling Torch writer Derek Burgan, with several interviews from key figures within the promotion and wrestlers on the card. In addition to the company's roster, Bloodymania events have featured such wrestlers as Roddy Piper, Último Dragón, Abdullah The Butcher, Dan Severn and Ken Shamrock.

Events

References